1948 births
Living people
British infotainers
Weather presenters

Wincey Willis (born Florence Winsome Leighton; 8 August 1948) is a British television and radio broadcaster who was most active in the 1980s. She is perhaps best known for being part of the line up at TV-am, the UK's first national operator of a commercial breakfast television franchise.

Early life and education 
Willis was born in Gateshead, County Durham. She grew up in Hartlepool and Barnard Castle. She was adopted by older parents, for whom she was an only child. In 2011, Willis said that she had never attempted to find her birth parents. Her poem on this subject, "Adoption", was recorded for a CD to celebrate the 25th anniversary of the BBC's Poetry Please radio series. She described herself as having "quite a strict upbringing", with no alcohol in the house and regular Christian worship. As a child, she wanted to be a vet. Willis left school at 16 and took a year out, before going to France and doing the equivalent of A-levels there. She then got a place at Strasbourg University.

Career 
Willis began her career as a travel rep, where she worked in North Africa, before moving to the record library and promotions department at Radio Tees in Newcastle upon Tyne. She joined the city's Tyne Tees Television in September 1981. Willis began presenting the weather for the network, despite admitting that it was not a subject she specialised in. The following year, she hosted her own Granada Television series, Wincey's Pets.

As part of the relaunch of TV-am by its new editor, Greg Dyke, Willis was "poached" from Tyne Tees. She replaced Commander David Philpott as the station's main weekday weather presenter on Good Morning Britain in May 1983. In doing so, she became ITV's first national female weather presenter. In addition to this, Willis hosted other segments on TV-am, such as those featuring pets and animals.

In 1985, she joined the game show Treasure Hunt as an adjudicator, working with Anneka Rice and Kenneth Kendall. Willis's first book, It's Raining Cats and Dogs, written about her animals, was published in 1986, with an introduction by naturalist Gerald Durrell. The same year saw the launch of The Weather Game, a board game made by Waddingtons and devised by Willis.

In 1987, she left TV-am to focus on other television work and conservation projects. She appeared in the title role in the Dick Whittington pantomime at City Hall in St Albans, alongside the Chuckle Brothers, in 1988. In 1989, she co-starred with Simon Groom in Dick Whittington at the Epsom Playhouse. Her second book, Greendays, was published in 1990. This was a diary with facts about environmental issues, featuring suggestions of relevant activities and projects. Her regular appearances on national television came to an end that year.

Willis took several years out to be a conservation volunteer around the world, at one point living in a tent on a Greek beach for six months whilst she guarded the local turtle population. She returned to television as a wildlife presenter in 1993 when she was given a slot on Tyne Tees Weekend. In 1999, it was reported that Willis was working for a worm composting company, and had said that her television work "had just dried up". 

Willis was the presenter and narrator of Left-handed children: a guide for teachers and parents, a 2010 educational video guide; she herself is left-handed. That year, it was announced that she would be presenting The Big Day Out, a Saturday morning radio programme on BBC Hereford & Worcester. Willis hosted the show from August 2010 until September 2012. She appeared as a contestant on the BBC television quiz show Celebrity Eggheads in December 2011.

Personal life 
Willis previously lived in the former Winston railway station in County Durham, which was on the closed Barnard Castle line. Known for her love of animals, she had over 50 of them living in her home. While at TV-am, Willis also lived in a flat in Camden, north west London, returning to Barnard Castle every other weekend. She later moved to Hereford. She is an advanced scuba diver.

During her period of television fame, Willis was married to Malcolm, who worked in sales.

Bibliography 

 It's Raining Cats and Dogs, Elm Tree (1986)
 Greendays, Red Fox (1990)
 Words, Coleman, Bristow (1998)

References

External links 

 
 
 The Wincey Willis Blog
 BFI Filmography
People from County Durham (before 1974)
People from Herefordshire
BBC radio presenters
British women writers